Mamelodi Sundowns Ladies FC is a women's professional soccer club from Pretoria, South Africa. It competes in the SAFA Women's League the top tier women's football league in South Africa. They are the most successful women's team in South African with four titles. The team, together with the men's team are owned by Patrice Motsepe. They enjoy a strong relationship with their male counterparts.

The team won the inaugural CAF Women's Champions League in 2021. In the qualifiers, which were a tournament, they won it without a single loss. This sent them to the 2021 CAF Women's Champions League which they also won not only without a defeat but also without conceding.

History 
The club was founded on 4 September 2009 by owner Patrice Motsepe and they participated inaugural SAFA Women's League and club finished 1st position of 12. The club competed in the inaugural COSAFA Women's Champions League emerging victorious.

The club also won the first CAF Women's Champions League in 2021.

In hopes to retain the 2022 COSAFA Women's Champions League the club started as clear favourites by scoring 8 goals against the Mozambican club CD Costa do Sol winning the match 8 to 1 in Sugar Ray Xulu Stadium in Durban. The second match was against the Botswana club Double Action Ladies, despite being favorites they were forced to share the spoils drawing 1-1. The club topped the group on a superior goal difference which led them to their second consecutive final.

The Zambian held out for most of until extra time as the score remained 0-0, Sundowns lost on penalties against Green Buffaloes. Giving them their first loss in the competition. But since they won the previous Champions League they qualified automatically.

Players 

Mamelodi Sundowns Ladies FC squad for 2021–22 season.

Club management

Managers' records

Honours

National 
SAFA Women's League
Winners (5) record : 2013, 2015, 2020, 2021, 2022

International 
COSAFA Women's Champions League
Winners (1): 2021
Runners up  (1): 2022
CAF Women's Champions League
Winners (1): 2021
Runners-up (1): 2022

See also 
 Mamelodi Sundowns F.C.

References

External links 
 

Soccer clubs in Pretoria
Association football clubs established in 2009